Chitiz Tamang (born 17 April 1993) is an Indian cricketer. He made his first-class debut for Sikkim in the 2018–19 Ranji Trophy on 1 November 2018. He made his List A debut on 24 September 2019, for Sikkim in the 2019–20 Vijay Hazare Trophy.

References

External links
 

1993 births
Living people
Indian cricketers
Sikkim cricketers
Place of birth missing (living people)